"Two" is the season 3 premiere and 66th episode overall of the American television anthology series The Twilight Zone.

The radio adaptation of this episode starred Don Johnson in the Charles Bronson role.

Opening narration

Plot
A woman wearing a tattered uniform stumbles into a deserted city. She spots what was a restaurant and finds a can of chicken in the kitchen. A man in a worn uniform soon enters the kitchen, and after a brief scuffle, knocks her out and eats the chicken. He later wakes the woman by dumping a pot of water on her face. He says there is no reason to fight anymore, as there are no more armies, but eventually realizes that she cannot understand him and departs.

The woman tracks him down, and they wander down the street, coming to a movie theater. He stares at a poster for a wartime romance film and turns to smile at her. They find the skeletal remains of soldiers at the theater entrance and abruptly grab the rifles of the dead owners, simultaneously aiming at each other. After a tense moment, the man turns and walks away, slinging his weapon over his shoulder.

The woman follows him, and the two walk along the city street. They stop in front of a store with a dress in the smashed display window. Upon her saying "prekrasnyy", he hands the dress to her and tells her to put it on. She enters a recruiting office next to the department store to change into the dress, but then she notices the jingoistic enlistment posters on the wall. She grabs her rifle, exits the office and angrily shoots at him twice, but misses. The man gets up, looks at her incredulously, and walks away.

The next morning, the man has changed out of his uniform into a makeshift suit and has found two jars of peaches. He sees the woman waiting, peeking at him from behind a truck in the street below. He yells at her to leave, to "take your war to more suitable companions." She emerges from behind the truck wearing the dress. He tosses one of the jars to her and says "prekrasnyy". She smiles, and they walk away together.

Closing narration

Music
An abbreviated version of the music for this episode, composed by Nathan Van Cleave, served as the basis for the opening and closing music for the radio drama CBS Radio Mystery Theater. The episode relies heavily on the music as there is very little dialogue throughout.

Production notes

This episode was filmed on the backlot of Hal Roach Studios in Culver City, California, which was falling apart due to mismanagement and disuse (the facilities were finally torn down in 1963). Very little set decoration was needed to create the illusion of an abandoned city. The interior bracing that holds up the facade is visible through the second storey windows in the opening shots of the episode and the credits.

The sound for the "blaster" was taken from Forbidden Planet, where Robby the Robot exclaims that an Earthman's weapon was "a simple blaster".

References

Zicree, Marc Scott: The Twilight Zone Companion.  Sillman-James Press, 1982 (second edition)
DeVoe, Bill. (2008). Trivia from The Twilight Zone. Albany, GA: Bear Manor Media. 
Grams, Martin. (2008). The Twilight Zone: Unlocking the Door to a Television Classic. Churchville, MD: OTR Publishing.

External links

1961 American television episodes
The Twilight Zone (1959 TV series season 3) episodes
Post-apocalyptic television episodes
Two-handers